Tröstau is a municipality in the district of Wunsiedel in Bavaria in Germany.

References

Wunsiedel (district)